The boys' tournament at the 2018 Summer Youth Olympics was held at the Club Atlético San Isidro from 13 to 15 October 2018.

Group stage

All times are Argentina Time (UTC–3).

Placement rounds

Fifth place game

Bronze medal game

Gold medal game

Final ranking

See also
Rugby sevens at the 2018 Summer Youth Olympics – Girls' tournament

References

External links
Buenos Aires 2018: Rugby Sevens

Rugby sevens at the 2018 Summer Youth Olympics